Orciano may refer to:

Orciano di Pesaro, a commune in the province of Pesaro e Urbino, Italy
Orciano Pisano, a commune in the province of Pisa, Italy